Kari Antero Uotila (born 4 January 1955 in Pertunmaa) is a Finnish politician and member of Finnish Parliament, representing the Left Alliance. He has been member of parliament two times: 1995-2007 and since 2008.

External links
Parliament of Finland: Kari Uotila
Home page 

1955 births
Living people
People from Pertunmaa
Left Alliance (Finland) politicians
Members of the Parliament of Finland (1995–99)
Members of the Parliament of Finland (1999–2003)
Members of the Parliament of Finland (2003–07)
Members of the Parliament of Finland (2007–11)
Members of the Parliament of Finland (2011–15)
Members of the Parliament of Finland (2015–19)
Wärtsilä